The 2007 Porsche Mobil 1 Supercup season was the 15th Porsche Supercup season. The races were all supporting races in the 2007 Formula One season. It travelled to nine circuits across Europe and also a double-header in Bahrain.

Teams and drivers

Race calendar and results

Championship standings

† — Drivers did not finish the race, but were classified as they completed over 90% of the race distance.

Teams' Championship

References

External links
The Porsche Mobil 1 Supercup website
Porsche Mobil 1 Supercup Online Magazine

Porsche Supercup seasons
Porsche Supercup